Robert Philip Hemmings (born 28 February 1996) is an English cricketer who most recently played for Derbyshire County Cricket Club. Primarily a right-arm fast-medium bowler, he also bats right handed.

External links
 

1996 births
Living people
English cricketers
Cricketers from Stoke-on-Trent
Derbyshire cricketers
Staffordshire cricketers